Katja Maria Hänninen (born 26 January 1980, in Oulainen) is a Finnish politician. She has been a member of the Parliament of Finland since 2014, when she replaced Merja Kyllönen, who became an MEP. She is a member of the Left Alliance.

References

External links
Own website
Eduskunta profile

1980 births
Living people
People from Oulainen
Left Alliance (Finland) politicians
Members of the Parliament of Finland (2011–15)
Members of the Parliament of Finland (2015–19)
Members of the Parliament of Finland (2019–23)
21st-century Finnish women politicians
Women members of the Parliament of Finland